Flugfélag Íslands Flight 704 was an aircraft accident involving the controlled flight into terrain (CFIT) of a Fokker F27 Friendship on the island of Mykines in Faroe Islands, on 26 September 1970 at 10:56. The Flugfélag Íslands aircraft was on its way to Vágar Airport, making a pass over Mykines before crashing into the highest peak of the island. Of the 34 passenger and crew on board, 8 died in the crash. The captain and 7 passengers, all seated on the left side of the plane, were killed. 26 passengers and crew survived, some with serious injuries. Three passengers hiked for an hour to reach Mykines village to alert the authorities. Most of the villagers went up the mountain to aid the survivors before the arrival of the Danish patrol vessel .

Accident

The Fokker F-27 TF-FIL, listed as flight FI 704, was originally scheduled to fly from Reykjavík, Iceland, to Vágar, Faroe Islands, on 23 September 1970 but due to fog in Vágar the flight was delayed and again the day after. On 25 September TF-FIL left Reykjavík with an estimated arrival over the "MY" radio beacon near Vágar of 15:52. Due to fog at Vágar, TF-FIL was unable to land and continued on to Bergen Airport in Norway and landed there at 18:22. The following day weather had improved and Flight 704 left Bergen at 08:22 in the morning. The plane arrived over Mykines at about 10:20 but due to foggy conditions, it went into a holding pattern. At 10:52 TF-FIL acknowledged that they would now turn around to the MY beacon and initiate a landing procedure. At about 10:55 TF-FIL reported that it was inbound over MY and descending. About one minute later, the aircraft impacted on the slopes of the highest point of Mykines.

Cause
The cause of the accident was that Flight 704 began the descent through cloud procedure from a starting point other than over "MY" NDB. During this procedure the aircraft hit close to the highest point of Mykines at an altitude of about 1500 ft. The reason for starting the procedure from a position other than "MY", was probably an interference caused by Flight 704's weather radar, which caused the ADF to give the crew an erroneous indication that they were passing "MY" NDB.

Media
Flogvanlukkan í Mykinesi – a two-part Faroese documentary about the crash by Dagmar Joensen-Næs.

References

External links
  

1970 in Iceland
1970 in the Faroe Islands
Accidents and incidents involving the Fokker F27
Icelandic
Aviation accidents and incidents in the Faroe Islands